Bannerline is a 1951 American drama film directed by Don Weis. The film stars Keefe Brasselle, Sally Forrest and Lionel Barrymore.

Plot
Young Mike Perrivale (Keefe Brasselle) is an ambitious reporter for the Carravia Clarion, who resents being assigned to cover only social events and small stories.  He takes the advice of his girlfriend, Richie Loomis (Sally Forrest), to interview Hugo Trimble (Lionel Barrymore), a beloved local history teacher and community gadfly.  Trimble, in the hospital and fatally ill, regrets that he was unable to root out corruption in the city's government, which has been under the control of gangster Frankie Scarbine (J. Carrol Nash).  To cheer up the dying man, Perrivale persuades his editor and publisher to publish a few copies of the paper with a false front page proclaiming that Scarbine has been indicted and the government leaders have resigned.  Trimble is touched by the gesture but knows immediately that the page is a fake.

Soon after at a bar, Perrivale encounters Josh (Lewis Stone), a former reporter and alcoholic who now runs the Clarion presses. Several drinks in, the two decide to print the complete run of the next day's edition using the fake front page.  Scarbine is enraged, even though he has some admiration for Perrivale's nerve, and eventually demands that Perrivale be fired.  Perrivale considers how he might be able to influence a "runaway grand jury" to investigate the city's corruption.  After Mike is beaten by one of the Scarbine's men, Josh and the publisher take their knowledge to the grand jury.  Recovering from his injuries in the hospital, Mike learns that Scarbine's gang has left town and the mayor and city council have resigned.  Finally getting a promotion, Mike and Richie are able to marry.

Cast
 Keefe Brasselle as Mike Perrivale
 Sally Forrest as Richie Loomis
 Lionel Barrymore as Hugo Trimble
 Lewis Stone as Josh
 J. Carrol Naish as Frankie Scarbine
 Larry Keating as Stambaugh
 Spring Byington as	Mrs. Loomis
 Warner Anderson as Roy
 Elisabeth Risdon as Mrs. Margaret Trimble
 Michael Ansara as Floyd
 John Morgan as Al

Reception

Box office
According to MGM records the movie earned $350,000 in the US and Canada and $107,000 elsewhere, making a loss to the studio of $203,000.

References

Citations

Sources

External links
 
 
 
 

1951 films
1951 drama films
American drama films
American black-and-white films
Films about journalists
American films based on plays
Films directed by Don Weis
Metro-Goldwyn-Mayer films
1951 directorial debut films
1950s English-language films
1950s American films